Bimo Fakja (born 1919) was a former Albanian footballer who played for Vllaznia Shkodër, Partizani Tirana and Flamurtari Vlorë as well as the Albania national team. He is also known for being part of the 1946 Albania vs Yugoslavia football match, which was Albania's first official match. In total, he earned 6 caps for the national team between 1946 and 1952.

International career
He made his debut for Albania in an August 1946 friendly match against Montenegro in Shkodër and earned a total of 6 caps, scoring no goals. His final international was a May 1948 Balkan Cup match against Romania.

Honours
Kategoria Superiore (3): 1945, 1946, 1948.

References

1919 births
Possibly living people
Association football midfielders
Albanian footballers
Albania international footballers
KF Vllaznia Shkodër players
FK Partizani Tirana players
Flamurtari Vlorë players
Kategoria Superiore players